Abhinaya (born 1971) is an Indian actress who works in Kannada films and soaps. She is best known for her performance in the 1984 movie Anubhava directed and enacted by Kashinath, which brought her Karnataka State Film Award for Best Actress in 1983 – 84.

Career 
Abhinaya entered films as a child artist. She acted in Bhagyavantha, Devatha Manushya and Benkiya Bale as child artist and got selected as a lead for the movie Anubhava at the age of 13.  The movie was a massive hit and she got the Best Actress award in Karnataka State Film Awards in 1983 – 84.

Abhinaya went on to appear in many hit movies throughout 1980s and 1990s playing mostly supporting roles. After a gap, she made her comeback to the big screen through the movie ‛Crush’ in 2019.

Awards 
 1983–84 – Karnataka State Film Award for Best Actress – Anubhava
 1983 – Filmfare Award for Best Actress – Kannada – Anubhava

Selected filmography 

Films
 Anubhava (1984) 
 Kindari Jogi (1989)
 Gajapathi Garvabhanga (1989)
Hathya Kanda (1990)
 Kollur Kala (1991)
 Urvashi Kalyana (1993)
 Appa Nanjappa Maga Gunjappa (1994)
 Police Dog (2002)
 Premigagi Naa (2002)
 Crush (2019)

Television
Belli Chukki
Devi
 Nagu Naguta Nali
 Baduku
 Agni Sakshi
 Kavyanjali 
 Hitler Kalyana
 Katheyondu Shuruvagide

References 

Indian television actresses
20th-century Indian actresses
Actresses in Kannada cinema
Actresses in Kannada television
1971 births
Living people
21st-century Indian actresses
Indian film actresses